Gute may refer to:

People 
 Gotlanders, population of the island of Gotland

Places 
 Gute (Pale), a village in the municipality of Pale, Bosnia and Herzegovina
 Gute, Gotland, a settlement in Sweden

Other 
 Gute sheep, landrace breed of domestic sheep native to the Swedish island of Gotland
 Gute Zeiten, schlechte Zeiten a German television soap opera

See also 
 Gute Nacht (disambiguation)